Watinoceras is a genus of acanthoceratid ammonite that lived during the early Turonian stage of the Late Cretaceous.

Description 
Early whorls are compressed, finely ribbed with inner and outer ventrolateral and siphonal tubercles as in Neocardioceras, but siphonal row is soon lost. Later the venter may be concave between rows of ventrolateral clavi or rounded with ribs passing over in chevrons. Ornament usually becomes coarser with age. Derivation is from Neocardioceras. Watinoceras and Mammites gave rise to the other genera in the subfamily. Older classifications included Watinoceras in the subfamily Mammitinae instead.

Species include Watinoceras coloradoense, W. reesidei, and W. thompsonense.

Biostratigraphic significance 
The first occurrence of the species Watinoceras devonense marks the beginning of the Turonian.

Distribution 
Fossils of the genus have been found in:
 Ponta das Salinas, Angola
 Cotinguiba Formation, Brazil
 Mungo River Formation, Cameroon
 Blackstone Formation, Alberta, Canada
 Second White Speckled Shale and Kaskapu Formations, British Columbia
 McKenzie River Valley, Northwest Territories
 Mesitas del Colegio and Yaguará, Colombia
 Brießnitz Formation, Germany
 Agua Nueva and Indidura Formations, Mexico
 Eze-Aku Formation, Nigeria
 Draa el Miaad, Tunisia
 Mancos Shale, Arizona and New Mexico
 Greenhorn Formation, Colorado and Minnesota
 Colorado Group, Colorado and New Mexico
 La Luna Formation, Venezuela

References

Further reading 
 W.J. Arkell et al., 1957.  Mesozoic Ammonoidea, Treatise on Invertebrate Paleontology Pat L Mollusca 4.  Geological Society of America and University of Kansas Press.
 J. Kennedy et al., 1999. Lower Turonian (Upper Cretaceous) Watinoceras devonense Zone ammonite fauna in Colorado, USA. USGS Publications Warehouse - Citations View

Acanthoceratidae
Ammonitida genera
Index fossils
Turonian life
Late Cretaceous ammonites
Ammonites of Africa
Fossils of Angola
Cretaceous Cameroon
Fossils of Cameroon
Cretaceous Nigeria
Fossils of Nigeria
Cretaceous Tunisia
Fossils of Tunisia
Ammonites of Europe
Cretaceous Germany
Fossils of Germany
Ammonites of North America
Cretaceous Alberta
Cretaceous British Columbia
Cretaceous Northwest Territories
Fossils of Canada
Cretaceous Mexico
Fossils of Mexico
Cretaceous Arizona
Cretaceous Colorado
Cretaceous Minnesota
Cretaceous geology of New Mexico
Fossils of the United States
Ammonites of South America
Cretaceous Brazil
Fossils of Brazil
Cretaceous Colombia
Fossils of Colombia
Cretaceous Venezuela
Fossils of Venezuela
Fossil taxa described in 1930